The Diaphanopterodea or Paramegasecoptera are an extinct order of moderate to large-sized Palaeozoic insects. They are first known from the Middle Carboniferous (late Serpukhovian or early Bashkirian in age), and include some of the earliest known flying insects.

Overview
Despite their very early appearance in the insect fossil record, they represent a specialised group of Palaeodictyopteroidea (Palaeozoic beaked insects), unique among representatives of that group in having evolved the ability to fold their wings over their thorax and abdomen in a manner similar to, but not homologous with, the Neopteran insects. The nymphs also had an unusual appearance, being covered in numerous hairlike filaments.

Diaphanopterodea are distinguished by a number of other characteristics, and are generally considered to be a monophyletic group. About ten families are known. The group died out at the end of the Permian period, victims of the End-Permian mass-extinction, without leaving any descendants.

References

 Carpenter, F. M. 1992. Superclass Hexapoda. Volume 3 of Part R, Arthropoda 4; Treatise on Invertebrate Paleontology, Boulder, Colorado, Geological Society of America.

External links
Diaphanopterodea at the Tree of Life project (list of taxa)

Prehistoric insects
Extinct insect orders
Carboniferous insects
Permian insects
Pennsylvanian first appearances
Lopingian extinctions
Taxa named by Anton Handlirsch
Palaeodictyopteroidea